Yitong Tian (born 9 December 1994), is a Chinese actress. She graduated from the Shanghai Theater Academy in 2017. She became known for her supporting roles in Chinese television dramas Perfect Partner and And The Winner Is Love.

Career
In 2016, Tian debuted in the variety show Freshman on Hunan TV. She then starred in drama Beyond Light Years, playing the supporting role of Zhen Lei. In 2017, she graduated from the Shanghai Theater Academy and signed onto Sunlight Media, a studio co-founded by Zoe Ki and Tiffany Tang. The same year, she played supporting roles in historical drama Hero's Dream and romance drama My Amazing Boyfriend 2: Unforgettable Impression. In 2020, She gained recognition for starring Bonnie in modern drama Perfect Partner. The same year, she starred in Wuxia romance drama And The Winner Is Love as one of the main leads.

Filmography

Television series

References

External links
 
 
 

Chinese television actresses
21st-century Chinese actresses
Actresses from Tianjin
Shanghai Theatre Academy alumni
1994 births
Living people